Litothamnus is a genus of Brazilian flowering plants in the tribe Eupatorieae within the family Asteraceae.

 Species
 Litothamnus ellipticus R.M.King & H.Rob. - Bahia
 Litothamnus nitidus (DC.) W.C.Holmes - Bahia

References

Asteraceae genera
Eupatorieae
Endemic flora of Brazil